Aneta Todorczuk - Perchuć (born 9 December 1978, in Białystok) is a Polish actress and vocalist. She is affiliated with the Warsaw musical theatre, Studio Buffo.

Films
 2002–2007 - Samo Życie
 2004–2006 - Pensjonat pod Różą
 2004 - Stacyjka
 2001 - Kameleon
 1999–2006 - Na dobre i na złe

References

Polish actresses
1978 births
Living people
Actors from Białystok
21st-century Polish singers
21st-century Polish women singers
Artists from Białystok